William Walton (1902–1983) was a British composer and conductor

William Walton may also refer to:

In sports
William Walton (cricketer, born 1862) (1862–1925), English cricketer
William Walton (cricketer, born 1799) (1799–1882), English cricketer
William Walton (footballer) (1871–1929), English footballer
William Walton (rugby) (1874–1940), rugby union and rugby league footballer who played in the 1890s and 1900s
Bill Walton (born 1952), American basketball player and sportscaster
Billy Walton (1871–1963), English footballer
Bill Walton (footballer) (1894–1953), Australian rules footballer who played with Collingwood in the Victorian Football League (VFL)
Billy Walton (hurler) (1961–2012), Irish hurler

In politics
William Walton (bishop) (1716–1780), Vicar Apostolic of the Northern District of England
William B. Walton (1871–1939), U.S. Representative from New Mexico
William M. Walton (1832–1915), Attorney General of Texas
William Walton (merchant) (1706–1768), American merchant and politician in New York
William de Walton, MP for Lancashire

Other
William Walton (painter) (1909/10–1994), American painter and chairman, U.S. Commission on Fine Arts
William Walton (writer) (1784–1857), English author on Spain and Portugal
William Walton (merchant) (1706–1768), American merchant and politician in New York
William Lovelace Walton (1788–1865), British Army officer
William R. Walton (1923–2001), geologist and researcher in the study of modern foraminifera